

Events

Pre-1600
 913 – Constantine VII, the eight-year-old illegitimate son of Leo VI the Wise, becomes nominal ruler of the Byzantine Empire under the regency of a seven-man council headed by Patriarch Nicholas Mystikos, appointed by Constantine's uncle Alexander III on his deathbed.
1505 – The M8.2–8.8 Lo Mustang earthquake affects Tibet and Nepal, causing severe damage in Kathmandu and parts of the Indo-Gangetic plain.
1513 – Battle of Novara. In the Italian Wars, Swiss troops defeat the French under Louis II de la Trémoille, forcing them to abandon Milan; Duke Massimiliano Sforza is restored.
1523 – Swedish regent Gustav Vasa is elected King of Sweden and, marking a symbolic end to the Kalmar Union, 6 June is designated the country's national day.

1601–1900
1654 – Swedish Queen Christina abdicated her throne in favour of her cousin Charles Gustav and converted to Catholicism.
1762 – In the Seven Years' War, British forces begin the Siege of Havana and temporarily capture the city.
1813 – The Battle of Stoney Creek, considered a critical turning point in the War of 1812. A British force of 700 under John Vincent defeats an American force twice its size under William Winder and John Chandler.
1822 – Alexis St Martin is accidentally shot in the stomach, leading to William Beaumont's studies on digestion.
1832 – The June Rebellion in Paris is put down by the National Guard.
1844 – The Young Men's Christian Association (YMCA) is founded in London.
1859 – Queensland is established as a separate colony from New South Wales. The date is still celebrated as Queensland Day.
1862 – The First Battle of Memphis, a naval engagement fought on the Mississippi results in the capture of Memphis, Tennessee by Union forces from the Confederates.
1882 – The Shewan forces of Menelik II of Ethiopia defeat the Gojjame army in the Battle of Embabo. The Shewans capture Negus Tekle Haymanot of Gojjam, and their victory leads to a Shewan hegemony over the territories south of the Abay River.
1889 – The Great Seattle Fire destroys all of downtown Seattle.
1892 – The Chicago "L" elevated rail system begins operation.
1894 – Governor Davis H. Waite orders the Colorado state militia to protect and support the miners engaged in the Cripple Creek miners' strike.

1901–present
1912 – The eruption of Novarupta in Alaska begins. It is the largest volcanic eruption of the 20th century.
1918 – Battle of Belleau Wood in World War I: the U.S. Marine Corps suffers its worst single day's casualties while attempting to recapture the wood at Château-Thierry (the losses are exceeded at the Battle of Tarawa in November 1943).
1925 – The original Chrysler Corporation was founded by Walter Chrysler from the remains of the Maxwell Motor Company.
1933 – The first drive-in theater opens in Camden, New Jersey.
1934 – New Deal: U.S. President Franklin D. Roosevelt signs the Securities Exchange Act of 1934 into law, establishing the U.S. Securities and Exchange Commission.
1942 – The United States Navy's victory over the Imperial Japanese Navy at the Battle of Midway is a major turning point in the Pacific Theater of World War II. All four Japanese fleet carriers taking part—,  and —are sunk, as is the heavy cruiser . The American carrier  and the destroyer  are also sunk.
1944 – Commencement of Operation Overlord, the Allied invasion of Normandy, with the execution of Operation Neptune—commonly referred to as D-Day—the largest seaborne invasion in history. Nearly 160,000 Allied troops cross the English Channel with about 5,000 landing and assault craft, 289 escort vessels, and 277 minesweepers participating. By the end of the day, the Allies have landed on five invasion beaches and are pushing inland.
1971 – Soyuz 11 is launched. The mission ends in disaster when all three cosmonauts, Georgy Dobrovolsky, Vladislav Volkov, and Viktor Patsayev are suffocated by uncontrolled decompression of the capsule during re-entry on 29 June.
  1971   – Hughes Airwest Flight 706 collides with a McDonnell Douglas F-4 Phantom II of the United States Marine Corps over the San Gabriel Mountains, killing 50.
1975 – British referendum results in continued membership of the European Economic Community, with 67% of votes in favour. 
1982 – The Lebanon War begins. Forces under Israeli Defense Minister Ariel Sharon invade southern Lebanon during Operation Peace for the Galilee, eventually reaching as far north as the capital Beirut.
1985 – The grave of "Wolfgang Gerhard" is opened in Embu, Brazil; the exhumed remains are later proven to be those of Josef Mengele, Auschwitz's "Angel of Death"; Mengele is thought to have drowned while swimming in February 1979.
1993 – Punsalmaagiin Ochirbat wins the first presidential election in Mongolia.
1994 – China Northwest Airlines Flight 2303 crashes near Xi'an Xianyang International Airport, killing all 160 people on board.
2002 – Eastern Mediterranean event. A near-Earth asteroid estimated at ten meters in diameter explodes over the Mediterranean Sea between Greece and Libya. The explosion is estimated to have a force of 26 kilotons, slightly more powerful than the Nagasaki atomic bomb.
2017 – Syrian civil war: The Battle of Raqqa begins with an offensive by the Syrian Democratic Forces (SDF) to capture the city from the Islamic State of Iraq and the Levant (ISIL).

Births

Pre-1600
1436 – Regiomontanus (Johannes Müller von Königsberg), German mathematician, astronomer, and bishop (d. 1476)
1519 – Andrea Cesalpino, Italian philosopher, physician, and botanist (d. 1603)
1599 – Diego Velázquez (date of baptism), Spanish painter and educator (d. 1660)

1601–1900
1606 – Pierre Corneille, French playwright and producer (d. 1684)
1622 – Claude-Jean Allouez, French-American missionary and explorer (d. 1689)
1714 – Joseph I of Portugal, King of Portugal from 31 July 1750 until his death (d. 1777)
1755 – Nathan Hale, American soldier (d. 1776)
1756 – John Trumbull, American soldier and painter (d. 1843)
1799 – Alexander Pushkin, Russian author and poet (d. 1837)
1810 – Friedrich Wilhelm Schneidewin, German philologist and scholar (d. 1856)
1841 – Eliza Orzeszkowa, Polish author and publisher (d. 1910)
1850 – Karl Ferdinand Braun, German-American physicist and academic, Nobel Prize laureate in 1909 for physics (d. 1918)
1851 – Angelo Moriondo, Italian inventor of the espresso machine (d. 1914)
1857 – Aleksandr Lyapunov, Russian mathematician and physicist (d. 1918)
1862 – Henry Newbolt, English historian, author, and poet (d. 1938)
1867 – David T. Abercrombie, American entrepreneur and co-founder of lifestyle brand Abercrombie & Fitch (d. 1931)
1868 – Robert Falcon Scott, English sailor and explorer (d. 1912)
1872 – Alix of Hesse, German princess and Russian empress (d. 1918)
1875 – Thomas Mann, German author and critic, Nobel Prize laureate (d. 1955)
1890 – Ted Lewis, American singer, clarinet player, and bandleader (d. 1971)
1891 – Masti Venkatesha Iyengar, Indian author and academic (d. 1986)
  1891   – Erich Marcks, German general in WWII who planned Operation Barbarossa (d. 1944) 
1896 – Henry Allingham, English World War I soldier and supercentenarian (d. 2009)
  1896   – Italo Balbo, Italian air marshal and fascist politician who played a key role in developing Mussolini's air force (d. 1940)
1897 – Joel Rinne, Finnish actor (d. 1981)
1898 – Jacobus Johannes Fouché, South African politician, 2nd State President of South Africa (d. 1980)
  1898   – Ninette de Valois, English ballerina, choreographer, and director (d. 2001)
1900 – Manfred Sakel, Ukrainian-American psychiatrist and physician (d. 1957)

1901–present
1901 – Jan Struther, English author, poet and hymnwriter who created the character Mrs Miniver (d. 1953)
  1901   – Sukarno, Indonesian engineer and politician, 1st President of Indonesia (d. 1970)
1902 – Jimmie Lunceford, American saxophonist and bandleader (d. 1947)
1903 – Aram Khachaturian, Armenian composer and conductor (d. 1978)
1906 – Max August Zorn, German mathematician and academic who is noted for Zorn's Lemma (d. 1993)
1907 – Bill Dickey, American baseball player and manager who played in eight World Series, winning seven (d. 1993)
1909 – Isaiah Berlin, Latvian-English historian and philosopher (d. 1997)
1915 – Vincent Persichetti, American pianist and composer (d. 1987)
1916 – Hamani Diori, Nigerien academic and politician, 1st President of Niger (d. 1989)
1917 – Kirk Kerkorian, American businessman, founded the Tracinda Corporation (d. 2015)
1918 – Kenneth Connor, English comedy actor (d. 1993)
  1918   – Edwin G. Krebs, American biochemist and academic, Nobel Prize laureate (d. 2009)
1919 – Peter Carington, 6th Baron Carrington, English army officer and politician, 6th Secretary General of NATO (d. 2018)
1923 – V. C. Andrews, American author, illustrator, and painter (d. 1986)
  1923   – Jean Pouliot, Canadian broadcaster (d. 2004)
1925 – Maxine Kumin, American poet and author (d. 2014)
  1925   – Frank Chee Willeto, American soldier and politician, 4th Vice President of the Navajo Nation and a noted code talker during World War II (d. 2013)
1926 – Klaus Tennstedt, German conductor (d. 1998)
1929 – James Barnor, Ghanaian photographer
  1929   – Sunil Dutt, Indian actor, director, producer, and politician (d. 2005)
1930 – Frank Tyson, English-Australian cricketer, coach and journalist (d. 2015)
1932 – David Scott, American colonel, engineer, and astronaut who was the commander of Apollo 15
1933 – Heinrich Rohrer, Swiss physicist and academic, Nobel Prize laureate (d. 2013)
1934 – Albert II, King of the Belgians from 9 August 1993 to 21 July 2013 (abdicated)
1935 – Jon Henricks, Australian swimmer; winner of two Olympic gold medals in 1956
1936 – D. Ramanaidu, Indian actor, director, and producer, founded Suresh Productions (d. 2015)
  1936   – Levi Stubbs, American soul singer; lead vocalist of the Four Tops (d. 2008)
1939 – Louis Andriessen, Dutch pianist and composer (d. 2021)
  1939   – Gary U.S. Bonds, American singer-songwriter
1940 – Willie John McBride, Northern Irish rugby player who toured with the British Lions five times
1943 – Richard Smalley, American chemist and academic, Nobel Prize laureate in 1996 for chemistry (d. 2005)
1944 – Monty Alexander, Jamaican jazz pianist
  1944   – Phillip Allen Sharp, American molecular biologist; 1993 Nobel Prize laureate (Physiology or Medicine)
  1944   – Tommie Smith, American sprinter and football player; winner of 1968 Olympic 200m gold medal in a world record time
1946 – Tony Levin, American bass player and songwriter
1947 – David Blunkett, British Labour politician; Home Secretary 2001–2004
  1947   – Robert Englund, American actor; best known for Nightmare on Elm Street
  1947   – Ada Kok, Dutch butterfly stroke swimmer; winner of three Olympic medals including gold in 1968
1948 – Arlene Harris, American entrepreneur, inventor, investor and policy advocate
1949 – Holly Near, American folk singer and songwriter
1954 – Harvey Fierstein, American actor and playwright; winner of four Tony Awards
  1954   – Wladyslaw Zmuda, Polish footballer and manager; 91 caps for Poland and voted Best Young Player at the 1974 FIFA World Cup
1955 – Sam Simon, American director, producer and screenwriter; co-developer of The Simpsons (d. 2015)
1956 – Björn Borg, Swedish tennis player; winner of eleven Grand Slam singles titles including five consecutive Wimbledons
1963 – Jason Isaacs, English actor
1966 – Sophie Jamal, Canadian endocrinologist involved in scientific misconduct
  1966   – Tony Yeboah, Ghanaian footballer
1967 – Paul Giamatti, American actor and producer
1972 – Natalie Morales, American television journalist and NBC News anchor
1974 – Uncle Kracker, American musician
  1974   – Sonya Walger, British-American actress
1977 – David Connolly, Irish footballer
1979 – Roberto De Zerbi, Italian football manager
1983 – Michael Krohn-Dehli, Danish footballer
1985 – Sebastian Larsson, Swedish footballer
  1985   – Drew McIntyre, Scottish professional wrestler
  1985   – Becky Sauerbrunn, American footballer; twice a winner of the FIFA Women's World Cup, also an Olympic gold medallist
1988 – Anthony Pilkington, Irish footballer
1990 – Gavin Hoyte, English born footballer who represented Trinidad and Tobago
  1990   – Pape Souaré, Senegalese footballer
1992 – DeAndre Hopkins, American football player
1993 – Vic Mensa, American rapper and singer
1994 – Yvon Mvogo, Swiss footballer
1995 – Julian Green, American soccer player
1998 – Kenny Pickett, American football player
2001 – Rayan Aït-Nouri, French-Algerian footballer

Deaths

Pre-1600
 184 – Qiao Xuan, Chinese official (b. c. 110) 
 863 – Abu Musa Utamish, vizier to the Abbasid Caliphate
 913 – Alexander III, Byzantine emperor (b. 870)
1097 – Agnes of Aquitaine, Queen of Aragon and Navarre
1134 – Norbert of Xanten, German bishop and saint (b. 1060)
1217 – Henry I, King of Castile and Toledo (b. 1204)
1251 – William III of Dampierre, Count of Flanders
1252 – Robert Passelewe, Bishop of Chichester
1480 – Vecchietta, Italian painter, sculptor, and architect (b. 1412)
1548 – João de Castro, Portuguese soldier and politician, Governor of Portuguese India (b. 1500)
1583 – Nakagawa Kiyohide, Japanese daimyo (b. 1556)

1601–1900
1661 – Martino Martini, Italian Jesuit missionary (b. 1614)
1799 – Patrick Henry, American lawyer and politician, 1st Governor of Virginia (b. 1736)
1813 – Antonio Cachia, Maltese architect, engineer and archaeologist (b. 1739)
1832 – Jeremy Bentham, English jurist and philosopher (b. 1748)
1861 – Camillo Benso, Count of Cavour, Italian politician, 1st Prime Minister of Italy (b. 1810)
1865 – William Quantrill, leader of a Confederate guerrilla band in the American Civil War (b. 1837)
1878 – Robert Stirling, Scottish minister and engineer, invented the stirling engine (b. 1790)
1881 – Henri Vieuxtemps, Belgian violinist and composer (b. 1820)
1891 – John A. Macdonald, Scottish-Canadian lawyer and politician, 1st Prime Minister of Canada (b. 1815)

1901–present
1916 – Yuan Shikai, Chinese general and politician, 2nd President of the Republic of China (b. 1859)
1922 – Lillian Russell, American actress and singer (b. 1860)
1935 – Julian Byng, 1st Viscount Byng of Vimy, English field marshal and politician, 12th Governor-General of Canada (b. 1862)
1939 – Constantin Noe, Megleno-Romanian editor and professor (b. 1883)
1941 – Louis Chevrolet, Swiss-American race car driver and businessman, founded Chevrolet and Frontenac Motor Corporation (b. 1878)
1946 – Gerhart Hauptmann, German novelist, poet, and playwright, Nobel Prize laureate (b. 1862)
1947 – James Agate, English author and critic (b. 1877)
1948 – Louis Lumière, French film director, producer, and screenwriter (b. 1864)
1955 – Max Meldrum, Scottish-Australian painter and educator (b. 1875)
1961 – Carl Gustav Jung, Swiss psychiatrist and psychotherapist (b. 1875)
1962 – Yves Klein, French painter (b. 1928)
  1962   – Tom Phillis, Australian motorcycle racer (b. 1934)
1963 – William Baziotes, American painter and academic (b. 1912)
1968 – Robert F. Kennedy, American soldier, lawyer, and politician, 64th United States Attorney General (b. 1925)
1976 – J. Paul Getty, American businessman, founded the Getty Oil Company (b. 1892)
1979 – Jack Haley, American actor (b. 1897)
1982 – Kenneth Rexroth, American poet and academic (b. 1905)
1983 – Hans Leip, German author, poet, and playwright who wrote the lyrics of Lili Marleen (b. 1893) 
1991 – Stan Getz, American saxophonist and jazz innovator (b. 1927)
1994 – Mark McManus, Scottish actor (b. 1935)
  1994   – Barry Sullivan, American film actor (b. 1912)
1996 – George Davis Snell, American geneticist and immunologist; awarded the Nobel Prize in Physiology or Medicine in 1980 for his studies of histocompatibility (b. 1903)
2005 – Anne Bancroft, American film actress; winner of the 1963 Academy Award for Best Actress for The Miracle Worker (b. 1931)
  2006   – Billy Preston, American singer-songwriter, pianist, and actor (b. 1946)
2009 – Jean Dausset, French-Spanish immunologist and academic; awarded the 1980 Nobel Prize in Physiology or Medicine for his studies of the genetic basis of immunological reaction (b. 1916)
2012 – Vladimir Krutov, Russian ice hockey player; together with Igor Larionov and Sergei Makarov, formed the famed KLM Line. (b. 1960)
2013 – Jerome Karle, American crystallographer and academic; awarded the 1985 Nobel Prize in Chemistry for research into the molecular structure of chemical compounds (b. 1918)
  2013   – Esther Williams, American swimmer and actress (b. 1921)
2014 – Lorna Wing, English psychiatrist and physician; pioneered studies of autism (b. 1928)
2015 – Vincent Bugliosi, American lawyer and author; prosecuting attorney in the Tate–LaBianca murders case (b. 1934)
  2015   – Ludvík Vaculík, Czech journalist and author; noted for The Two Thousand Words which inspired the Prague Spring (b. 1926)
2016 – Viktor Korchnoi, Russian chess grandmaster; arguably the best player never to become World Chess Champion (b. 1931)
  2016   – Peter Shaffer, English playwright and screenwriter; works included Equus and Amadeus (b. 1926)

Holidays and observances
 Christian feast day:
 Claudius of Besançon
Ini Kopuria (Anglican Church of Melanesia, Church of England, Episcopal Church)
Marcellin Champagnat
Norbert
 June 6 (Eastern Orthodox liturgics)
D-Day Invasion Anniversary
Engineer's Day in Taiwan
Korean Children's Union Foundation Day in North Korea
Memorial Day in South Korea
National Day of Sweden, marking the end of the Danish-ruled Kalmar Union and the coronation of King Gustav Vasa
National Huntington's Disease Awareness Day in the United States
Queensland Day
UN Russian Language Day

References

External links

 
 
 

Days of the year
June